National Democratic Front may refer to:

National Democratic Front (Algeria)
National Democratic Front (Central African Republic)
National Democratic Front (French India)
National Democratic Front (Guyana)
National Democratic Front (India)
National Democratic Front (Iran)
National Democratic Front (Mexico)
National Democratic Front (Myanmar)
National Democratic Front (Peru)
National Democratic Front (Philippines)
National Democratic Front (Romania)
National Democratic Front (Yemen)
National United Front of Democracy Against Dictatorship, sometimes shortened to the National Democratic Front (Thailand)